William H. Holland (1841 – May 27, 1907) was an educator who served one term in the Texas Legislature. He was the brother of Medal of Honor recipient Milton M. Holland.

He was born into slavery in Marshall, Texas in 1841, the child of Captain Bird Holland and a slave named Matilda.  At some time during the 1850s, his father purchased his freedom along with his two brothers and sent them to attend an abolitionist-run school in Ohio.

During the American Civil War, he served in the Union Army, while his father died while serving as a Confederate Army officer.  After the war ended, he returned to Texas where he taught school and became active in the Republican Party.  He was elected to the legislature in 1876.

In the Legislature, he sponsored the bill calling for creation of Prairie View Normal College (now Prairie View A&M University). In 1876 and 1880 he was chosen as a delegate to the Republican national convention. He later submitted a memorandum to the Texas legislature leading to the establishment of a school, the Deaf, Dumb, and Blind Institute for Colored Youth; he was appointed by the governor as its first Superintendent.

In 2018, the city council of Austin, Texas, voted to rename Jeff Davis Avenue to William Holland Avenue.

See also
African-American officeholders during and following the Reconstruction era

References

External links
Texas Legislators: Past & Present – William H. Holland
Handbook of Texas Online – William H. Holland
Findagrave – William H. Holland
 Fight over Texas' Confederate symbols continues across the state

1841 births
1907 deaths
Republican Party members of the Texas House of Representatives
Free Negroes
African-American state legislators in Texas
African-American politicians during the Reconstruction Era
20th-century African-American people